Sibualong is a village in Balaesang district, Donggala Regency in North Sulawesi province, Indonesia. Its population is 2437. Located about 1520 metres from the equator, it is the closest village in Sulawesi to the equator.

Climate
Sibualong has a tropical rainforest climate (Af) with moderate to heavy rainfall year-round. With only 1410 mm of annual rainfall, it is one of the driest places with this climate type.

References

Populated places in Central Sulawesi